Dalków may refer to the following places in Poland:
Dalków, Lower Silesian Voivodeship (south-west Poland)
Dalków, Łódź Voivodeship (central Poland)